Javier Molins is an independent Spanish art curator, critic and author.

Career
Molins has curated exhibitions for art galleries and museums in Spain, the UK, Italy, Dubai and Singapore. He has written exhibition catalogues on a number of modern and contemporary artists including Pablo Picasso, Sean Scully, Manolo Valdés and Jaume Plensa. He served as Director of Communication and Development of the Institut Valencià d'Art Modern under the direction of Kosme de Barañano from 2001 to 2004, and was Director of Marlborough Gallery Madrid from 2005 to 2006. In 2011, his documentary film Valdes as Pretext was selected by Spain's Ministry of Culture for the Marché du Film of the Cannes Film Festival. In 2019 his book Artistas en Los Campos Nazis (Artists in the Nazi Camps) was awarded third prize in the Spanish Culture Ministry's annual book awards. 

In 2019, Molins curated an exhibition titled HUMAN for Sean Scully in the church of San Giorgio Maggiore during the Venice Biennale, which featured a felt sculpture of 10.4m in height and an illuminated manuscript created especially for the exhibition.

Journalism
Molins is a contributing writer for the Spanish language current affairs magazine Cambio 16  and a cultural critic for ABC (newspaper).

References 

Year of birth missing (living people)
Living people
Place of birth missing (living people)
Spanish art curators
Spanish art critics
Spanish writers